Emin Ali Bedir Khan (1851, in Kandiye, Crete – 1926, in Cairo) was a founding member of the Kurd Society for Cooperation and Progress and vice president of the Society for the Elevation of Kurdistan and Kurdish politician.

Emin Ali was the son of Bedir Khan Beg, the last hereditary ruler of the Principality of Bothan and his spouse Rewshen. He attended a state school of the Ottoman Empire and after his graduation, he began a career in the Ottoman bureaucracy. He left Crete at the age of sixteen, and went to Constantinople to receive his formation. He returned to Kandiye in 1873. There, he was employed at the local Ottoman administration.

Professional career 
In the 1880s, he became a judicial inspector and worked in various cities and courts of the Ottoman Empire trying to implement the judicial reforms which had been issued in 1879. In 1888, he was dismissed from his post, and he was apparently without any work until 1894, when he was appointed first to the city council of Constantinople. In the early 1900s, he was again appointed as a juridical inspector, and was sent to several cities throughout the Empire such as Edirne or Ankara.

Exile from 1906–1908 
In 1906, the career of Emin Ali took a sudden turn as he was sent into exile after his cousin Abdürrezzak Bedir Khan and his brother Ali Şamil Bedir Khan were charged of being involved in the murder of Ridvan Pasha, the Mayor of Constantinople.

Engagements in Kurdish organizations 

Following the Young Turks Revolution against Sultan Abdulhamid II he was allowed to return to Istanbul and in 1908 he became a founding member of the Kurd Society for Cooperation and Progress. At the time he established close ties with Abdulkadir Ubeydullah, as he was also a member of the Kurdish movement. But the Society was banned in 1909 by the Committee for Union and Progress (CUP)  as it didn't see any benefit of a Kurdish organization. In 1918 he was elected the Vice President of the Society for the Elevation of Kurdistan, opposing the election of Abdulkadir as President. But the disputes continued as Abdulkadir advocated for a autonomy within a future Turkish state, while Emin Ali Bedir Khan was in favor for a Kurdish independence but also the recognition of the state by a sultan as a Caliph. Emin Ali was also an active participant in the negotiations of the Paris Peace Conference. He maintained the view that the province of Van should be included in a Kurdistan, opposing Serif Pasha who represented the Society for the Elevation of Kurdistan at the Peace Negotiations in Paris. He wrote a to the president of the peace conference in Paris and also showed a map, what according to him should include a future Kurdistan to the British representative in Istanbul, Richard Webb. 

Emin Ali would go on to establish the Society for Kurdish Social Organizations which advocated for an independent Kurdistan. He didn't give up on the Kurdish cause and established ties with Greek diplomats whose support he was able to gain. Then he and his son, Celadet Bedir Khan, also requested the support of the British, to facilitate a Kurdish uprising in Mosul, but they declined to support the cause. As it was imminent that a Turkish republic was to be created, he went into exile in Egypt, where he died in 1926.

Cultural interests 
Emin Ali was interested in Kurdish literature and wrote Kurdish poetry, he was also passionate about western classical music. He was fluent in Greek, French, Arabic, Turkish and Kurdish.

Family 
He was married twice, and was the father of eight children: Sureyya, Celadet, Kamuran, Hikmet, Tevfik, Safder, Bedirhan and Meziyet.

References 

Kurdish politicians
Kurdish people from the Ottoman Empire
1851 births
1926 deaths
Kurdish independence activists
19th-century Kurdish people